Shola is a 1978 Pakistani Punjabi film directed by Rehmat Ali. The lead cast includes Asif Khan, Najma, Mustafa Qureshi, Usman Pirzada, and Bindiya. It was an action thriller movie which won 4 Nigar Awards, including the Best Punjabi Film Award for the year.

Plot
The story of Shola revolves around a revenge theme.

Cast
 Najma
 Asif Khan
 Mustafa Qureshi
 Bindiya
 Usman Pirzada
 Adeeb
 Badar Munir
 Tariq Azia
 Nanha
 Shahnawaz
 Jalil Afghani
 Seema
 Kemal Irani
 Ilyas Kashmiri
 Sabiha Khanum

Music and soundtracks
The music was composed by  Kamal Ahmed and lyrics were penned by Hazeen Qadri and Saeed Gilani:
 Dhada Charia A Ishq Da Rang Mahia... Singer(s): Nahid Akhtar
 Dil Mangda Tera Pyar, Tut Tut Tara Ra Ra Rampa... Singer(s): Nahid Akhtar
 Ik Alhar Kurri Way Aria, Teray Uttay Dhull Geyi... Singer(s): Nahid Akhtar
 Khat Aya Meray Sajna Da, Khat Parh Kay Chham Chham Nachan... Singer(s): Mehnaz
 Lakk Patla Hularay Khaway, Meithun Kalian Na Chukia Jaway... Singer(s): Nahid Akhtar
 Tu Agar Chahay To Qatray Ko Samundar Kar Day... Singer(s): Nahid Akhtar, Rajab Ali,  Ghulam Abbas

Awards

References

1978 films
1970s Punjabi-language films
Pakistani action films
Punjabi-language Pakistani films
Nigar Award winners